Reginaselache is an extinct genus of xenacanthiform shark known from the Early Carboniferous (Mississippian age, mid-Viséan) of central Queensland, Australia. It was found in the middle the Ducabrook Formation, northwest of Springsure. It was first named by Susan Turner and Carole J. Burrow in 2011 and the type species is Reginaselache morrisi.

References

Fossil taxa described in 2011
Carboniferous sharks
Prehistoric fish of Australia